Zane Jordan (born 18 July 1991 in Mufulira, Zambia) is an Olympic swimmer from Zambia. He swam for Zambia at the 2008 Olympics, finishing 65th in the 50 Freestyle and at the 2012 Summer Olympics, finishing 41st in the 100 backstroke.

Jordan grew up in Zambia with his parents and four siblings before moving to England as a 7-year-old. His mother is English. The family moved to Australia. He has little memory of his childhood in Zambia.

References

1991 births
Living people
People from Mufulira
Sportspeople from Doncaster
Zambian male backstroke swimmers
Swimmers at the 2008 Summer Olympics
Swimmers at the 2012 Summer Olympics
Olympic swimmers of Zambia
Swimmers at the 2010 Commonwealth Games
Commonwealth Games competitors for Zambia
Zambian people of English descent
Zambian emigrants to the United Kingdom